The Fallsington Historic District is a historic district in Fallsington, Pennsylvania.

The district's history spans over 300 years. While William Penn resided at nearby Pennsbury Manor, he attended Friends meeting in Fallsington.  The center of the district is Meetinghouse Square, where the first meetinghouse was built in 1690. The third meetinghouse, built in 1790, is currently used as a community center, the William Penn Center.  The fourth meetinghouse on the square, built in 1841, still operates as a place of worship for Quakers.

Historic Falsington offers tours of the district, including the interiors of three preserved buildings: the Moon-Williamson Log House, Burges-Lippincott House, and the Stagecoach Tavern.

The district was added to the National Register of Historic Places in 1972. It comprises 62 contributing buildings, one contributing site, and two contributing objects.

Quaker meeting houses
The first meeting house in the district was built in 1690.  Its site is marked by a bronze tablet erected in 1933.   The second meeting house in the district was built in 1728.  It is known as the Grambrel Roof House.  After the third meeting house was built, the Gambrel Roof House was used as a school and later was converted into an apartment building with five apartments.  It is three stories constructed of stone.

The third meeting house was constructed in 1789 and is now used as a community center called the William Penn Center.  In 1841 a fourth meeting house was built to the north of the Gambrel Roof House.  This is the meeting house currently in use.

References

External links

Historic Fallsington, Inc.
Fallsington Meeting History

Houses on the National Register of Historic Places in Pennsylvania
Federal architecture in Pennsylvania
Historic districts in Bucks County, Pennsylvania
Open-air museums in Pennsylvania
Museums in Bucks County, Pennsylvania
Houses in Bucks County, Pennsylvania
Historic districts on the National Register of Historic Places in Pennsylvania
National Register of Historic Places in Bucks County, Pennsylvania